Blick Art Materials is a family-owned retailer  and catalog art supply business.  Established as a mail order business by Dick Blick in 1911 and purchased by Robert Metzenberg in 1947, it is one of the oldest and largest art materials suppliers in the United States, as well as a primary supplier of mail order art supplies.

Background 
One of the primary suppliers of art supplies in the United States, Blick Art Materials offers over 90,000 products, including 8,000 sold under the Blick brand name, such as paints, brushes, canvas, artist papers, pastels, pencils, and markers. Blick's Utrecht brand products include handcrafted paints, mediums, and brushes. The company operates more than 65 retail stores in the United States, including 11 purchased from The Art Store in 2004, and 45 acquired in 2013 from Utrecht Art Supply. Each store hires about 20 people, mostly artists. The company's home office is in Highland Park, Illinois, and it operates three distribution centers, two in Galesburg, Illinois, and one in Monroe, New Jersey. According to venture capital and private equity firm Madison Parker Capital, Blick is the largest supplier of art materials in the United States.

History 
Dick Blick and his wife Grace started Dick Blick Company in 1911, working from their kitchen to sell their first product, the Payzant pen, by mail order. Robert Metzenberg purchased the company in 1947. Its parent company is Dick Blick Holdings, Inc., founded by Blick and Metzenberg. Metzenberg expanded the company, opening mail order offices in Las Vegas, Nevada; Hartford, Connecticut; and Allentown, Pennsylvania. He opened the first Blick retail store in Galesburg, Illinois, in 1974. He also established retail outlets in Las Vegas, Allentown, and Dearborn, Michigan. Metzenberg's grandson, Robert Buchsbaum, became CEO in 1996. The Business Committee for the Arts, a division of Americans for the Arts, honored Buchsbaum with its 2016 Leadership Award, for "extraordinary vision, leadership, and commitment to supporting the arts and for encouraging other businesses to follow their lead."

References

External links
 Dickblick.com

Retail companies established in 1911
Companies based in Lake County, Illinois
Galesburg, Illinois
Highland Park, Illinois
1911 establishments in Illinois
Retail companies based in Illinois
Family-owned companies of the United States
Arts and crafts retailers